Cole Turner is a fictional character on the WB television series Charmed, portrayed by series regular Julian McMahon between seasons three and five. McMahon returned for a guest appearance in the show's seventh season, for its 150th episode. Charmed is a series which focuses on three good witches, the prophesied "Charmed Ones", sisters who battle the forces of evil. Cole is an adversary-turned-ally of the sisters introduced in the third season and a love interest of main character Phoebe Halliwell, portrayed by Alyssa Milano. Like the show's main characters, Cole also possessed a number of magical abilities; the most commonly used were the power to teleport and the power to throw projective energy balls which could stun or kill.

Within the series' narrative, Cole is a Cambion, half-human and half-demon by birth and blood, and better known to the demonic world for over a hundred years as the legendary demonic assassin Belthazor. Cole is dispatched by the Source of all Evil to kill the Charmed Ones only to fall in love with then-youngest sister Phoebe Halliwell, renounce evil and become a close ally of the Charmed Ones. Though Cole eventually completely rids himself of his demonic nature, and marries Phoebe in the fourth season, he never gains the trust of new youngest sister Paige (Rose McGowan).

As part of his storyline, the character later returns to evil after unwillingly becoming the new Source. As the Source, Cole is eventually vanquished by the Charmed Ones, only to come back from death itself in his attempts to win Phoebe back. By this point, he is one of the most powerful beings to ever exist. Driven insane, Cole is, through his own doing, once again killed by the sisters in the fifth season. When the character returns for a guest appearance in the seventh season, it is unclear what kind of being he is, but he states that he is caught somewhere between life and death, atoning for his sins.

Character arc

Season three (2000–01)
Cole Turner makes his first appearance in the third-season (2000–01) premiere episode, "The Honeymoon's Over". Charmed Ones Phoebe (Alyssa Milano) and Prue (Shannen Doherty) run into Assistant District Attorney Cole Turner at the site where they killed a demon, and cover their tracks. Over the course of the episode, it becomes apparent to the audience that Cole is himself a very powerful demon, pursuing Phoebe romantically and deceiving the sisters as to his true nature in order to finally kill them.

In "Power Outage", Cole's superiors, the demonic Triad, learn that he may have developed genuine romantic feelings for Phoebe; Cole responds by killing them, forcing him into hiding. Meanwhile, the sisters acquire a target in the red-and-black-skinned demon Belthazor (Michael Bailey Smith).  In "Sleuthing with the Enemy", the Charmed Ones discovers Cole and Belthazor are one and the same, but when Cole convinces Phoebe that he, being half human, truly loves her, she fakes his death so that her sisters Piper (Holly Marie Combs) and Prue will not hunt for him.

When Cole re-emerges, causing a rift between Phoebe and her sisters, he attempts to re-ingratiate himself with his demonic peers, the Brotherhood of the Thorn, as the sisters' double agent. When Prue and Piper are both killed following a successful mission by the Source's assassin Shax (Michael Bailey Smith) in the season finale "All Hell Breaks Loose", Cole begs the Source (again, Michael Bailey Smith) to turn back time and prevent the exposure of magic. The Source agrees on the condition that Phoebe remain in the Underworld under his command, though he secretly orders her to be killed. Shax attacks the Halliwell Manor once more after time is reversed, but this time Leo (Brian Krause), Piper's husband who is also the sisters' guardian angel (whitelighter) is not available to heal either Piper or Prue, who lie gravely wounded.

Season four (2001–02)
The season four premiere "Charmed Again" reveals Leo arrived in time to heal Piper, but Prue died of her injuries, reflecting Doherty's departure from the series. Leo assisted Phoebe to escape the Underworld, absconding on the Source's deal. With Prue dead, the sisters are no longer the Charmed Ones, and Cole does what he can to assist Phoebe and Piper from Shax's continued attacks. Piper and Phoebe regain their full abilities—becoming Charmed Ones once again—when they discover their younger half-sister, Paige Matthews (Rose McGowan), alongside whom they finally destroy Shax.

In "Black as Cole", Cole proposes to Phoebe while they vanquish a low-level demon. Later they find that Sykes has been mimicking Belthazor and in a bid to vanquish him Cole takes on his demonic form but has Phoebe create a potion to kill his demonic half if he can not change back. Before he can change back, a woman looking to avenge his killing of her love picks up the potion and throws it at him, causing Belthazor to die.  In "Lost and Bound", Paige gets Cole a job as a legal aid lawyer. However he can't control his emotions and soon quits but not before the landlord who he was arguing with agrees to put the heating back on.

In "Charmed and Dangerous", the Source (Peter Woodward) breaks an age-old agreement and consumes the Hollow, an ancient force capable of devouring all magic, sealed away by good and evil because of its danger. The Seer (Debbi Morgan) tricks Cole into using the Hollow, which allows him to assist the Charmed Ones in vanquishing the physical version of the Source. It is revealed that the Seer tricked Cole into absorbing the old Source's power through his use of the Hollow, eventually causing him to become the new Source of Evil in "The Three Faces of Phoebe". An older version of Phoebe has turned bitter because of what he has done and warns her to save herself and states that they never got married, as she learned about his change and vanquished him, but she can't help but think what might have been. Once the older Phoebe sacrifices herself to save Cole, present-day Phoebe asks him if he is hiding anything; he says he is not.

The Source takes over Cole completely in "Marry-Go-Round".  The Seer warns him that marrying Phoebe would be the worst thing possible as they would have a son, the most powerful magical creature ever, who would be on the side of good, following the Charmed Ones' destiny. She tells him the only way the child will grow up evil is if Cole marries Phoebe in a dark ceremony. As the Source, he puts a spell on the Charmed Ones which makes Phoebe spotty and Piper and Paige over sleep. Paige and Phoebe argue as the latter suspects the former of trying to disrupt the wedding, having already made a mistake with the dress. When Paige tries to make an amends with Phoebe's spots it causes her to become invisible.

Suspecting evil magic to be involved, the sisters try to reverse it without success but pass the invisibility on to Paige. Cole asks the Seer to send a Lazarus demon (who she summoned to lure Phoebe to a cemetery for the purposes of a dark ceremony) to attack at the wedding which causes Phoebe to call it off, thus reversing the magic on her, which had been switched to Paige. When the Charmed Ones question the demon, he accuses Cole of betraying him and tells them that he sent him to attack them. But before he can out Cole as the Source, Cole vanquishes him and pretends to be the Seer before teleporting and pretending to be unconscious after she attacked him. Cole marries Phoebe in a dark wedding at the end of the episode, without her suspecting drinking her blood when a throne pricks her with the ceremony held at night with a dark priest.

Cole pretends to be the perfect husband by sending Leo and Piper on honeymoon to Hawaii and buying expensive gifts such as a new car in "The Fifth Halliwheel". Paige begins to suspect that Cole is a demon again especially when she catches Cole using powers on an innocent but is not sure of what she has seen. Cole as well as Leo calm Paige's fears before sending the power broker demon who had already gone after the innocent after her. The Seer also puts in a plan to make Phoebe pregnant using the full moon and a tonic. The Seer and Cole create a tonic which will ensure that the child is evil. From taking the tonic, the child will take over Phoebe's body and ensure that she remains by his side when she finds out that he is the Source. Phoebe eventually takes the tonic laced with chocolate to make the plan work.

In "Bite Me", different factions have tried to become ruler of the Underworld so Cole tries to make them all work together to beat good. However, one of the leaders encourages a group of vampires to rise up and rebel, which they do so after Cole refuses to listen to them. He almost gets exposed by Paige when she orbs in his home but he quickly covers this up by saying he has a migraine, hence why the blinds were down. The vampires try to turn Paige into one to get the other sisters and then overthrow the Source and become the new leaders. To keep himself on top, Cole kills the Queen after Phoebe and Piper inadvertently tell him what to do. Phoebe later discovers that she is pregnant before informing him in "We're Off to See the Wizard."

Cole tries to give up the Source to the Wizard after his human side becomes strong and Phoebe learns through a premonition that he is a demon again. But before the ritual is complete, the Seer, who has manipulated Phoebe, interrupts and vanquishes the Wizard. Cole is crowned the new Source with Phoebe as his Queen. Cole faces a coup in "Long Live the Queen" when Phoebe stops the killing of an innocent. Cole demands she make a choice.  Phoebe later learns from the Seer and Cole  that the tonic they were giving her was turning her evil. Phoebe eventually sides with her sisters and before Cole can destroy them she traps him in a crystal cage which allows the Charmed Ones to vanquish him.

In the season finale "Witch Way Now?", Phoebe discovers Cole is able to linger in the Demonic Wasteland, where vanquished demons go, because of his human soul. Phoebe visits him there, insisting to him that he move on to his afterlife. After she leaves, he accidentally discovers he can acquire the powers of other demons vanquished there. He becomes powerful enough to kill the beast that consumes the essence of those vanquished there and, finally, to escape. Once back in the real world, he saves the sisters' lives from a witch hunter.

Season five (2002–03)
In the season-five premiere "A Witch's Tail", Cole returns with numerous new abilities, making him more powerful than ever. Though he still loves Phoebe, she wants to move on from him and is frustrated by his attempts to win her back. In "Siren Song," he saves the life of a young future whitelighter named Melissa in a failed attempt to impress Phoebe. When he tries to confront the demonic Siren the sisters are pursuing, the Siren puts him under her control. Under this influence, he tries to strangle Phoebe to death before the Siren is ultimately vanquished, and Phoebe nearly dies. As a result, Cole finally understands the threat he poses to Phoebe and promises to stop using his powers, but succumbs to temptation and kills again when confronted by a sleazy landlord. In "Sympathy for the Demon", Cole is taunted by the spirit of the demon Barbas (Billy Drago), who manipulates the Halliwells so that Piper and Phoebe will reject his pleas for aid and Paige will be convinced to give Cole a power-stripping potion, inadvertently granting Barbas his powers and a corporeal form. To stop the threat of Barbas or anyone else possessing Cole's powers, Paige strips Barbas of Cole's powers and Cole takes them back. The sisters, however, fear that these abilities will make him evil again. 

In "Sam, I Am", Cole misuses his abilities and incinerates two robbers/murderers, and is later visited by two mysterious beings who identify themselves as Avatars. Neither good or evil, the Avatars offer Cole the opportunity to join their ranks and enjoy their powers. Refusing that offer, Cole tries to provoke the sisters to kill him by sending an assassin after them, knowing that they will be able to recover thanks to their recent contact with Paige's father, whitelighter Sam Wilder (Scott Jaeck). He is distraught to learn he cannot be killed, and is pushed over the edge into insanity. Cole reverts to malevolent means of winning Phoebe back, striking at the Charmed Ones in various underhand ways over several episodes, allying himself with an Egyptian warlock trying to steal a new body for his lover's spirit and manipulating the sisters into giving up the mortgage on the house with the goal of taking over the nexus underneath.

In Charmeds 100th episode "Centennial Charmed", Cole accepts the Avatars' offer and uses their powers to create an alternate reality where Piper and Phoebe never met Paige, who was instead killed by the Source before the Elders discovered her. In the new reality, Cole is once again Belthazor and no longer indestructible. He acts as the right-hand man of the Source and owns Halliwell Manor with Phoebe, but they are unhappy together. However, Paige is accidentally brought along from the real world when she orbs at the moment Cole changed reality, allowing her to escape the changes to reality, and teams up with Piper and Leo to destroy Cole. After convincing Phoebe to join their side, the Charmed Ones vanquish Cole for good, restoring the original reality.

Season seven (2005)
Cole makes a guest appearance in the 150th episode, "The Seven Year Witch", in season seven; Piper's disembodied spirit receives advice from Cole, who claims to be in limbo atoning for his sins. However, it is later revealed that Cole, watching over the sisters, orchestrated Piper's illness and sent Phoebe's short-lived boyfriend Drake (Billy Zane) to her, all so that Phoebe could learn to believe in love again. However he also did this to get Piper and Leo back together so that they could be a beacon for Phoebe not to give up on love and turn into the bitter old woman as seen in "The Three Faces of Phoebe". In 2010, Cole returned in the Charmed Season 9 comic book series. This time he has a minor role and only supporting in the spirit realm with Prue.

Analysis
As a lawyer and a demon, one writer notes that Cole is part of the same "corporate" metaphor as the Wolfram & Hart firm in the television series Angel.

References 

Charmed (TV series) characters
Charmed (TV series) demons
Fictional assassins
Fictional avatars
Fictional characters who can teleport
Fictional half-demons
Fictional lawyers
Fictional shapeshifters
Television characters introduced in 2000
Fictional attempted suicides
Male characters in television
da:Phoebes Kærester#Cole Turner
ru:Список персонажей телесериала «Зачарованные»#Коул Тёрнер